Wilson State Park is a state park located within the city limits of Harrison in the U.S. state of Michigan.  The park occupies  along the shores of Budd Lake.

History
The Michigan Department of Natural Resources lists the park among thirteen state parks established in 1920 following creation of the Michigan State Parks Commission in 1919. Land for the park was donated to the city of Harrison in 1900 by a lumber company, then transferred to the state in 1922. The state park was dedicated in 1927. The Civilian Conservation Corps was active in the park from 1939 to 1941.

Activities and amenities
The state park offers swimming, picnicking, fishing for muskellunge, bass, panfish, perch and walleye, camping, and lodge.

References

External links
Wilson State Park Michigan Department of Natural Resources
Wilson State Park Map Michigan Department of Natural Resources

Protected areas of Clare County, Michigan
State parks of Michigan
Civilian Conservation Corps in Michigan
Protected areas established in 1920
1920 establishments in Michigan